{
  "type": "FeatureCollection",
  "features": [
    {
      "type": "Feature",
      "properties": { "title": "Kao Yuan University", "marker-color": "#ff0000"},
      "geometry": {
        "type": "Point",
        "color": "red",
        "coordinates": [
          120.2657461166382,
          22.841444811770376
        ]
      }
    }
  ]
}
Kao Yuan University (KYU) is a private university in Kaohsiung Science Park, Lujhu District, Kaohsiung, Taiwan.

KYU offers a wide range of undergraduate and graduate programs, including programs in engineering, management, design, humanities, and social sciences. Some of the most popular programs at KYU include Industrial Design, Mechanical Engineering, Information Management, and International Business.  

The university also offers several graduate programs, including Master's degrees in Business Administration, Industrial Design, and Mechanical Engineering.

History
The university was originally established in 1986 as Private Kao Yuan Junior College of Technology. In 1989, it was approved by the Ministry of Education and subsequently it started recruiting students. In 1991, it was renamed to Kao Yuan Junior College of Technology and Commerce and again to Kao Yuan Institute of Technology in 1998. It was finally renamed to Kao Yuan University in 2005.

Faculties
 College of Business and Management
 College of Engineering
 College of Informatics
 College of Mechatronics Engineering

Campuses
The university consists of two campuses. The first campus named Campus One covers an area of 11 hectares and the second campus named Campus Two covers 14.2 hectares.

Library
The university library consists of two joint buildings. The first building was constructed in 1996 and the second one in 2005. The library total space is 13,641 m2. The library has more than 292,000 volume of books and more than 470 title of periodicals.

Transportation
The university is accessible within walking distance South of Luzhu Station of the Taiwan Railways.

See also
 List of universities in Taiwan

References

External links

  

1986 establishments in Taiwan
Educational institutions established in 1986
Universities and colleges in Kaohsiung
Universities and colleges in Taiwan